NOAAS Whiting (S 329), was an American survey ship that was in commission in the National Oceanic and Atmospheric Administration (NOAA) from 1970 to 2003. Previously, she had been in commission in the United States Coast and Geodetic Survey from 1963 to 1970 as USC&GS Whiting (CSS 29).

In 2005 the ship was transferred to Mexico, and she was commissioned in the Mexican Navy as ARM Río Tuxpan (BI-12), Mexico's first dedicated hydrographic survey ship.

Construction and commissioning
Whiting was built at a cost of $2,300,000 (USD) as a "coastal survey ship" (CSS) for the U.S. Coast and Geodetic Survey by the Marietta Manufacturing Company at Point Pleasant, West Virginia. She was launched on 20 November 1962 and delivered in July 1963. The Coast and Geodetic Survey commissioned her on 8 July 1963 in a ceremony at New Orleans, Louisiana, as USC&GS Whiting (CSS 29), the first and only Coast and Geodetic Survey ship of the name. When the Coast and Geodetic Survey and other United States Government agencies merged to form NOAA on 3 October 1970, Whiting became a part of the NOAA fleet as NOAAS Whiting (S 329), thus far the only NOAA ship to bear the name.

Capabilities
Whiting had a two-drum bathythermograph winch with a maximum pull of 1,000 pounds (454 kg). The lower drum had 3/16-inch (4.75-mm) wire rope, while the upper drum had  of 1/4-inch (6.4-mm) wire rope.

For acoustic hydrography and bathymetry, Whiting had 12-Khz deep-water echosounder, a 100-kHz shallow-water echosounder-lOOKhz, a 24- and 100-kHz hydrographic survey sounder, and the Intermediate Depth Swath Survey System (IDSSS), which is a 36-kHz sidescan sonar. In 1989 she underwent a major upgrade involving the installation of Hydrochart II, which employed a Microvax computer system to acquire and process hydrographic data.

Whiting had an ice-strengthened steel hull.

Whiting carried two  aluminum-hulled diesel-powered Jensen survey launches. For utility and rescue purposes, she also carried two open boats with gasoline-powered outboard motors, a  Boston Whaler fiberglass-hulled boat and  Monark aluminum-hulled boat.

At the time of her decommissioning, Whiting was the most technologically advanced hydrographic survey platform in the world. She and her survey launches were outfitted with modern multibeam echosounders and sidescan sonars, allowing efficient and rapid hydrographic surveys. The data storage for survey data was close to 2 terabytes, and nine workstations allowed survey personnel to process the data with state-of-the-art software and create three-dimensional models of the ocean floor, side-scan mosaics, and imagery of historical wrecks.

Operational career
Whiting conducted hydrographic and bathymetric surveys involving nautical charting and ocean mapping, primarily along the United States East Coast and United States Gulf Coast and off territories of the United States in the Caribbean. She also imaged historical wrecks like that of the United States Navy monitor  and was used for oceanography, fisheries research, and homeland security surveys. During her 39-year career, her operations took her from as far north as Duluth, Minnesota, to as far south as Honduras in Central America.

John F. Kennedy, Jr., crash
Arriving on the scene on the morning of 19 July 1999, Whiting joined the NOAA survey ship NOAAS Rude (S 590), which had been searching for the wreckage of the aircraft since 17 July using sidescan sonar and multibeam sonar. Whiting brought a more advanced sidescan sonar – only recently installed aboard the ship – to the effort that allowed a higher resolution and a higher search speed. While Whiting searched one area in dense fog, dodging lobster pots, Rude found and marked a high-confidence target in another area that appeared to be the missing Saratoga and radioed the United States Navy rescue and salvage ship  about the discovery; Whiting then searched the same area to gain higher-resolution images of the target. Late on 20 July, U.S. Navy divers from Grasp confirmed that the target was the missing aircraft. Whiting and Rude competed their survey of the crash area on 21 July 1999, then assisted the United States Coast Guard in maintaining security in the area. Later on 21 July, the two ships were released from duty in the crash area, and Whiting set course for Washington, D.C., to take part in the assumption-of-command ceremony for incoming NOAA Corps Director Rear Admiral Evelyn J. Fields at the Washington Navy Yard on 27 July. On 30 July 1999, the U.S. Coast Guard presented personnel involved in the search-and-rescue effort, including the crews of Whiting and Rude, with a commendation

... for exceptionally meritorious service from 17 July 1999 to 23 July 1999 in the search and recovery of the downed aircraft carrying John F. Kennedy, Jr.; his wife, Carolyn Bessette-Kennedy; and her sister Lauren Bessette. Members of the Unified Command distinguished themselves during this complex operation with their professional expertise and poise.

Egyptair Flight 990
The U.S. Coast Guard requested her support in the search for the downed aircraft, and she soon got underway for Naval Station Newport, Rhode Island, where she replenished her supplies and refueled before proceeding to the crash area. Arriving on the scene early on 2 November, she put her sidescan sonar to use and discovered the debris field of the crash on the ocean bottom on her first surveying pass, only 12 hours after arriving. After only a day of search operations, however, a gale with 50-knot (58-mph; 93-km/hr) winds and  seas forced Whiting and U.S. Navy survey ships in the area to return early on 3 November to Newport, where Whitings crew compared their survey data with data collected by U.S. Navy ships. A break in the weather allowed Whiting to return on 5 November to continue her bottom-mapping operations; although she had to suspend mapping operations briefly when the towfish containing her sidescan sonar became entangled in a lobster pot and was damaged, her crew was able to improvise a night repair in difficult weather conditions and put the sonar back into service. Whitings bottom map combined with charts provided by NOAA's Office of Coast Survey allowed the U.S. Navy rescue and salvage ship  to anchor safely over the debris field without disturbing the wreckage. Having completed her Egyptair Flight 990 work and turned over continued mapping and search operations to U.S. Navy remotely operated vehicles, Whiting departed Naval Station Newport on 11 November 1999 to return to her home port at Norfolk, Virginia.Anonymous, "NOAA COMPLETES ITS MISSION IN EGYPTAIR 990 INVESTIGATION", NOAA News, November 16, 1999.noaa.gov NOAA News: "NOAA COMPLETES ITS MISSION IN EGYPTAIR 990 INVESTIGATION," November 16, 1999.
[[File:USS S-5 (S-110) wreck sonar image.jpg|150px|thumb|left|Whiting'''s first sonar image of the wreck of the U.S. Navy submarine  on the bottom of the Atlantic Ocean, made in late July 2001 when Whiting discovered the wreck's exact location for the first time.]]

USS S-5
Whiting, which had just completed a summer in port at Norfolk, Virginia, and was bound for Boston, Massachusetts, to conduct hydrographic survey operations in New England, paused off Cape May in late July 2001 to search for the wreck. Whitings survey department approached the project as it would any typical hydrographic survey. Information on snags – obstructions on the ocean bottom that snarl fishing nets and gear – that local recreational fishermen had reported and reports of possible locations of the wreck from divers that had visited it provided Whiting with possible targets for her search. After her crew had prepared a plan for a systematic search, Whiting moved from target cluster to target cluster, mapping the ocean bottom using sidescan sonar. After eight hours of searching, Whiting found the wreck of S-5 directly over one of the suspected targets, made a sonar image of the wreck, and recorded its exact location. Whiting then made several more passes over the wreck to acquire additional images of it at various angles before leaving the scene. NOAA donated the sonar data NOAAS Whiting gathered to the Submarine Force Library and Museum in Groton, Connecticut, for archiving and display.

DecommissioningWhiting made her final cruise in NOAA service in 2002, when she deployed to the United States Virgin Islands, the Gulf of Mexico, and the southeast coast of the United States in support of homeland security and nautical charting. She returned in November 2002, bringing an end to 39 years of service.

Finding the aging Whiting no longer economical to operate, NOAA decommissioned her on 2 May 2003. NOAA replaced her with the survey ship NOAAS Thomas Jefferson (S 222).

Mexican Navy service
After Whiting was decommissioned, the United States Congress authorized her transfer to Mexico with the stipulation that Mexico employ her in supporting the hydrographic activities of the United States-Mexico Cooperative Charting Advisory Committee so as to enhance cooperation between the United States and Mexico in surveying and charting the border waters of both countries in the Gulf of Mexico and in the Pacific Ocean. Accordingly, by the authority of the United States Secretary of Commerce, Whiting was transferred to Mexico in a ceremony at Norfolk, Virginia, on 28 April 2005. Mexico immediately commissioned her into service in the Mexican Navy as ARM Río Tuxpan (BI-12), Mexicos first dedicated hydrographic survey ship.

See also
NOAA ships and aircraft

References

Notes

Bibliography

Ships of the NOAA Fleet, Rockville, Maryland: United States Department of Commerce, June 1989
 Wertheim, Eric. The Naval Institute Guide to Combat Fleets of the World, 15th Edition: Their Ships, Aircraft, and Systems''. Annapolis, Maryland: Naval Institute Press, 2007. .

Ships of the National Oceanic and Atmospheric Administration
Ships of the United States Coast and Geodetic Survey
Research vessels of the United States
Survey ships
Ships built in Point Pleasant, West Virginia
1962 ships
Research vessels of the Mexican Navy